Ramnes is a village in Tønsberg municipality, and former municipality in Vestfold og Telemark county, Norway. The village of Ramnes  was the administrative centre of the municipality.

Summary
The parish of Ramnæs was established as a municipality January 1, 1838 (see formannskapsdistrikt). According to the 1835 census the municipality had a population of 2,716. On 16 July 1873 an uninhabited part of Våle municipality was moved to Ramnes following a royal resolution. On January 1, 2002, Ramnes was merged with Våle to form the new municipality of Re, which on January 1, 2020, merged into Tønsberg. In 1996 Ramnes had a population of 3,579.

The municipality  and originally the parish  was named after the old farm Ramnes (Old Norse Rafnnes), since the first church was built there. The first element is rafn m 'raven', the last element is nes n 'headland'. (Here the headland is made by the meeting of two rivers.)

Ramnes Church
Church (Ramnes kirke) is a medieval era stone church for the parish of Ramnes in Nord-Jarlsberg rural deanery. The building material is stone and brick and it was built in 1150. The baptismal font from the 1100s. The towers are from the early 1600s. The altarpiece and pulpit and from the second half of the 1600s. The church is of long plan and has 250 number of seats.

References

Other sources

External links
Ramnes Church 

1838 establishments in Norway
Populated places established in 1838
Populated places disestablished in 2002
Former municipalities of Norway
Villages in Vestfold og Telemark
Tønsberg